The 2017 Vietnamese National Football Second League was the 19th season of the Vietnamese National Football Second League. The season began on 5 May 2017 and finished on 1 August 2017.

Rule changes
In this season, there are 16 teams divided in two groups in qualifying stage according to geographic region. The top 4 team of each group will be qualified to final round.
In final round, 8 teams will play 7 matches: 

 Match 1: 1A vs 4B
 Match 2: 1B vs 4A
 Match 3: 2A vs 3B
 Match 4: 2B vs 3A

 Match 5: Match 1 winner vs Match 4 winner
 Match 6: Match 2 winner vs Match 3 winner
 Match 7: Match 5 loser vs Match 6 loser

The winners of Match 5, 6 and 7 will promote to 2018 V.League 2. The loser of Match 7 will play a play-off match with the club finished last in 2017 V.League 2. The play-off winner will earn the last spot to participate in 2018 V.League 2.
The team with worst result in both groups will relegate to 2018 Vietnamese Third League.

Team changes
The following teams have changed division since the 2016 season.

To Vietnamese Second League
Promoted from Vietnamese Third League
 Phù Đổng 
 Kon Tum

Relegated from V.League 2
 Cà Mau

From Vietnamese Second League
Relegated to Vietnamese Third League
 Vĩnh Long
Promoted to V.League 2
 None

Teams

Qualifying round

Group A

Group B

Results

Group A

Group B

Season progress

Group A

Group B

Final round

Match 1 

Công An Nhân Dân advance to Match 5.

Match 2 

Bình Định advance to Match 6.

Match 3 

Hà Nội B advance to Match 6.

Match 4 

Bình Thuận advance to Match 5.

Match 5 

Công An Nhân Dân promote to 2018 V.League 2. Bình Thuận enter Match 7.

Match 6 

Bình Định promote to 2018 V.League 2. Hà Nội B enter Match 7.

Match 7 

Hà Nội B promote to 2018 V.League 2. Bình Thuận enter play-off match against club ranked 7th in 2017 V.League 2.

References

2017 in Vietnamese football